Strictly Speaking, by journalist and TV anchorman Edwin Newman, sub-titled "Will America be the death of English ?", was published in 1974. In the book Newman "skillfully skinned contemporary written and spoken English", pointing out how the language of Shakespeare had degenerated at the hands of business, journalists and politicians, becoming choked with "banalities, cliches, pomposities, redundancies and catchphrases".

References

English language